In cricket, a batsman reaches a triple century if they score 300 or more runs in a single innings. The Ranji Trophy is the premier first-class cricket championship played in India. Conducted by the Board of Control for Cricket in India, it was founded in 1934 as "The Cricket Championship of India". , a triple century has been scored on 46 occasions by 41 different batsmen in the Ranji Trophy.

The first triple century in the Ranji Trophy was scored by Maharashtra's Vijay Hazare against Baroda in the 1939–40 season. , the most recent triple century in the tournament was scored by Prithvi Shaw from Mumbai, who made 379 against Assam in the 2022–23 season. The highest score in the competition was made by B. B. Nimbalkar, who scored 443 runs not out for Maharashtra against Kathiawar in the 1948–49 season. It is the only instance of a quadruple century in the tournament. The highest number of triple centuries are scored by Ravindra Jadeja, who has reached the milestone three times while playing for Saurashtra. Jadeja is followed by V. V. S. Laxman, Cheteshwar Pujara, and Wasim Jaffer, with two triple centuries each. Tamil Nadu's Woorkeri Raman and Arjan Kripal Singh are the only two batsmen to score triple centuries in the same innings. , five batsmen have scored 290–299 runs in an innings, and three of them were not out.

Eight triple centuries have been made by players of Mumbai, which is more than any other team. Maharashtra have conceded five triple centuries, which is followed by four from Odisha and Goa & Jammu and Kashmir with three each. Wankhede Stadium in Mumbai has had six Ranji Trophy triple centuries scored at the venue, more than any other ground.

Triple centuries and above

Key

Notes

References

Ranji Trophy
Lists of Indian cricket records and statistics